These are Ethiopian Coffee Sport Club players, a professional football club based in Addis Ababa, Ethiopia.

List of former players

  Thomas Biketi 
 William Yabeun
 Aschalew Girma
 Aseged Tesfaye  
 Dawit Estifanos
 Binyam Assefa
 Abdulkerim Mohammed
 Million Begashaw
 Mengistu Bogale
 Mulugeta Woldeyes
 Ketema Birru
 Ashenafi Begashaw
 Asrat Adugna
 Teshome Tefera
 Tsegaye Fantahun
 Tilahun Mengesha
 Solomon Yoannes
 Nigussie W/Amanuel
 Ali Redi
 Abduselah (Fetushe)
 Paulos Getachew (Mango)
 Ashenafi Girma
 Yordanos Abay
 Sisay Demissie
 Tafesse Tesfaye
 Mesud Mohammed
 Wosenu Maze
 Edilu Dereje
Dawit Fekadu
 Tesfaye bekele
 Asechalew Girma
 Touk James  (Gk)
 Fasika Asefaw (Gk)
 Yordanos Abay

Notes 

Coffee
 
Ethiopian Coffee S.C.
Association football player non-biographical articles